The Austro-Hungarian Navy operated a pair of ironclad warships named SMS Kaiser Max:

, an armored frigate launched in 1862
, a center battery ship launched in 1875

Austro-Hungarian Navy ship names